alia is the Samoan adaptation of a drua or double-hulled Polynesian sailing watercraft.

References

External links
Image of an 'alia

Multihulls
Sailboat types
Polynesia